Ženski Fudbalski Klub Kamenica Sasa is a women's association football club based in Makedonska Kamenica, North Macedonia. They won two Macedonian Women's Football Championship titles, in 2020 and 2021.

History 
Kamenica Sasa was founded in June 2017, by former footballer Zoran Zlatkovski.

They won their first Macedonian Women's Football Championship title in 2019–20. Having won the league title, Kamenica Sasa qualified as North Macedonia's representative team to the 2020–21 Champions League qualifying round. They lost 3–1 to NSA Sofia in the first round.

They won their second consecutive league title in 2020–21. Kamenica Sasa played Juventus in the semi-final of the 2021–22 Champions League first qualifying round; they lost 12–0, and were eliminated.

Players

Current squad

Honours 
 Macedonian Women's Football Championship
 Winners (2): 2019–20, 2020–21

European record 
 UEFA Women's Champions League: 0 appearances
2020–21: First qualifying round
2021–22: First qualifying round (semi-final)

References

ŽFK Kamenica Sasa
Women's football clubs in North Macedonia
2017 establishments in the Republic of Macedonia
Association football clubs established in 2017